Lazear is a surname. Notable people with the surname include:

Edward Lazear (1948–2020), American economist
Jesse Lazear (1804–1877), American politician
Jesse William Lazear (1866–1900), American physician

See also
Lazar (name)
Lazear, Colorado